Serin Murray (born 1981) is an Australian mixed martial artist. She is the current ISKA World Oriental Rules Super Flyweight champion.

Career
Murray's MMA debut was in 2006 in Tokyo's Korakuen Hall against Megumi Fujii, who is one of the best women MMA fighters in the world. Murray was the first Australian woman in the Smackgirl event, but Fujii forced her submission in the first round with an ankle lock. Murray now specializes mainly in Muay Thai.

On 4 July 2009, she won the ISKA flyweight Muay Thai world title against Japan's Noriko Tsunoda.

Mixed martial arts record

|-
|Loss
|0-1
| Megumi Fujii
|Submission (ankle lock)
|Smackgirl: Legend of Extreme Women
|29 November 2006
|1
|0:20
|KORAKUEN HALL TOKYO, JAPAN
|
|-

See also
 List of female mixed martial artists

References

External links

1981 births
Living people
Australian female mixed martial artists
Mixed martial artists utilizing Muay Thai
Sportswomen from New South Wales
Sportspeople from Newcastle, New South Wales
Australian Muay Thai practitioners
Female Muay Thai practitioners